Lydell Ryan Sargeant (born January 31, 1987) is a former American football cornerback who played in the National Football League. He was signed by the Bills as an undrafted free agent in 2009. He played college football at Penn State.

Education 
Sargeant was a high school football recruit out of the state of California.  A Pittsburgh native, Sargeant briefly attended Gateway High School in Monroeville, Pennsylvania until transferring to Cabrillo High School in Lompoc, California.

Sargeant was ranked #11 best athlete in the nation and one of the top players in the state of California. Sargeant was named All-CIF, First-team All-State running back and MVP of Los Padres League.

College 
In 2005, Sargeant accepted an offer to play for Penn State over Stanford University and the University of Oregon. 

Sargeant played college football at PSU as a cornerback, wide receiver, and punt returner.

In 2009, Sargeant received Second-team All-Big Ten as a cornerback for Penn State, leading them in interceptions and pass breakups. Sargeant went on to train with Hall of Fame cornerback Deion Sanders in preparation for 2009 NFL Draft and Combine.  

Sargeant received his bachelor's degree from Pennsylvania State University in 2009.  He later earned a master's degree in Sport Management Studies in 2013.

Career

Buffalo Bills 
In 2009, Sargeant was signed by the Buffalo Bills as an undrafted free agent. In 2011, Sargeant retired from the NFL following a career ending knee injury.

College Administration 
Following his NFL career, Sargeant began working in College Administration and is currently working as the Director of Major Gifts for the College of Engineering at the Pennsylvania State University.

In 2018, Sargeant was selected to attend the NCAA Dr. Charles Whitcomb Leadership Institute. Sargeant has received multiple National Association of Collegiate Directors of Athletics (NACDA) awards and initiatives.

Politics 
In 2008, Sargeant introduced then U.S. Senator Barack Obama in front of a 22,000 assembled crowd at Penn State University for the 2008 Presidential election.  Sargeant was an influential member of Penn State Students for Barack Obama and also volunteered for him in the 2012 Presidential election.

At Penn State, Sargeant helped create and run PSU Vote, a non-partisan student voter registration organization. PSU Vote initiatives resulted in record breaking student registration and voter turnout for the 2008 Presidential Election.

References

External links

Buffalo Bills bio
Penn State Nittany Lions bio

1987 births
Living people
People from Monroeville, Pennsylvania
Players of American football from Pennsylvania
American football wide receivers
American football cornerbacks
Penn State Nittany Lions football players
Buffalo Bills players